A Festspielhaus or Festival Theatre is a German language term describing a theatre designed for opera or music festivals.  

There are several examples of Festival Theatres in the German-speaking world:
Bayreuth Festspielhaus or the Bayreuth Festival Theatre in Bayreuth, Germany
Festspielhaus Baden-Baden in  Baden-Baden, Germany
Grosses Festspielhaus (Grand Festival Hall) in Salzburg, Austria
Kleines Festspielhaus (Little Festival Hall) in Salzburg, Austria
Festspielhaus St. Pölten in St. Pölten, Austria
Festspielhaus Hellerau in the district of Hellerau, now part of Dresden, Germany; see info in the  German Wikipedia
FestSpielHaus, in Munich, Germany